Maruca fuscalis is a moth in the family Crambidae. It was described by Hiroshi Yamanaka in 1998. It is found on Sulawesi in Indonesia.

References

Moths described in 1998
Spilomelinae